Deepthi Kumara Gunarathne is a Sri Lankan activist, critic, politician and philosopher. He is a leader of the Samabima Party.

References

External links
 http://www.sathhanda.lk

Sinhalese politicians

Living people

Year of birth missing (living people)